Darius Lakdawalla is an economist. He is the Quintiles Chair in Pharmaceutical Development and Regulatory Innovation at the School of Pharmacy at the Leonard D. Schaeffer Center for Health Policy and Economics at the University of Southern California and co-founder and Chief Scientific Officer of Precision Health Economics, a health care consulting firm. Dr. Lakdawalla also serves as the Executive Director of the "Innovation and Value Initiative" (IVI), a multi-stakeholder scientific initiative that aims to improve the way value is measured and rewarded in the healthcare marketplace.

Lakdawalla previously served as the founding Director of Research at the Schaeffer Center, as well as the founding Director of Research at the Bing Center for Health Economics at the RAND Corporation.

Lakdawalla has research interests in the economics of risks to health and the organization of health care markets. Specifically, he has published papers that explore the reasons behind the declining use of nursing homes by the elderly, rising rates of obesity in America, acceleration in the rate of new HIV infections and the growth in disability among younger Americans. In addition, he has conducted research into the economic and social value of health, longevity, and healthcare.

Biography 
In 1995, Lakdawalla graduated with a bachelor's degree in philosophy and mathematics, summa cum laude, by Amherst College.

In 2000, Lakdawalla earned a Ph.D. in Economics from the University of Chicago.

Lakdawalla's work has been published in journals of economics, medicine, and health policy, and funded by the National Institute on Aging, the Eunice Kennedy Shriver National Institute of Child Health and Human Development, and the National Bureau of Economic Research. He is a past winner of the annual Milken Institute Distinguished Economic Research Award for best research in the field of economics and winner of the Garfield Award for best research on the economics of medical innovation.

Lakdawalla sits on the editorial boards of several academic journals including the Journal of Health Economics, the American Journal of Health Economics, and the Review of Economics and Statistics and is a member of the American Economic Association, the American Society of Health Economists, and the International Health Economics Association. He is a research associate at the National Bureau of Economic Research and has received press mentions in The New York Times, The Wall Street Journal, and The Economist.

Personal life 
Lakdawalla, who is of Indian Parsi descent, is married to planetary geologist and science journalist Emily Lakdawalla. The couple originally met when attending Amherst together as undergraduates in the early 1990s. They have two daughters.

References

Bibliography

Published articles

External links 
 
 Innovation and Value Initiative (2016).
 

Year of birth missing (living people)
Living people
American economists
American people of Indian descent
American businesspeople
American Zoroastrians
American people of Parsi descent
University of Chicago alumni